The 2012 Ulster Grand Prix races were held on the Dundrod Circuit between 6–11 August 2012 in County Antrim, Northern Ireland.  The event celebrated the 90th anniversary of the Ulster Grand Prix with a Bike Week Festival with practice commencing on Wednesday 8 August 2012 followed by the Dundrod 150 Races on Thursday 9 August and culminating with the Ulster Grand Prix on Saturday 11 August 2012.

See also
 North West 200
 Isle of Man TT
 Manx Grand Prix

References

External links
 Official website

2012
2012 in British motorsport
2012 in Northern Ireland sport
2012 in motorcycle sport
August 2012 sports events in the United Kingdom